The 2021–22 Danish 2nd Division started with a group of twelve teams. After 22 rounds the group was split in a promotion group and a relegation group. The top two teams of the promotion group was promoted to the 2022–23 Danish 1st Division.

Participants
Kolding IF and Skive IK finished the 2020–21 season of the Danish 1st Division in 11th and 12th place, respectively, and were relegated to the 2nd Division. They replaced Nykøbing FC and Jammerbugt FC, who were promoted to the 2021–22 Danish 1st Division.

Stadia and locations

League table

Promotion Group
The top 6 teams will compete for 2 spots in the 2022–23 Danish 1st Division.
Points and goals carried over in full from the regular season.

Relegation Group
The bottom 6 teams will compete to avoid the 2 relegations spots to the 2022–23 Danish 3rd Division.
Points and goals carried over in full from the regular season.

References

External links
  Danish FA

2021–22 in Danish football
Danish 2nd Division
Danish 2nd Division seasons